Ol' Colony Golf Complex is a  municipal public golf course in Tuscaloosa, Alabama. The 18-hole course opened in December 2000 on 597 acres that was once a farm plantation for a mental institution named Cain's Colony. Ol' Colony was designed by professional golfer Jerry Pate, who played golf for The University of Alabama.

The University of Alabama made Ol’ Colony its home course and constructed a training facility, The Jerry Pate Center, on the grounds in 2005. In 2008, Golf Digest ranked Ol’ Colony as one of the Top 100 "Best Places You Can Play" and recently a "Top 10 in Alabama Course."

Ol’ Colony also operates the Tuscaloosa chapter of The First Tee program, a youth golf program designed to promote character development and life-enhancing values through the game of golf.

See also
 Alabama Crimson Tide golf

References

External links
Ol' Colony Home Page
Tuscaloosa County Park & Recreation Authority

Landmarks in Alabama
Golf clubs and courses in Alabama
Sports venues in Tuscaloosa, Alabama